Phreatodessus is a genus of beetles in the family Dytiscidae, containing the following species:

 Phreatodessus hades Ordish, 1976
 Phreatodessus pluto Ordish, 1991

References

Dytiscidae